Tita may refer to:

People

Given name and nickname
 Tita (Lord Byron) (1798-1874), full name Giovanni Battista Falcieri, personal servant of Lord Byron
 Tita Bărbulescu (1936-2021), Romanian folk singer
 Tita Rădulescu (1904-unknown), Romanian bobsledder
 Tita Merello (1904-2002), Argentine actress and dancer
 Tita Muñoz (1926-2009), Filipina actress
 Tita Duran (1929-1991), Filipina actress
 Tita Kovač Artemis (1930-2016), Slovene chemist and writer
 Tita de Villa (1931-2014), Filipina actress
 Tita Mandeleau (born 1937), Senegalese writer
 Tita Valencia (born 1938), Mexican novelist and poet
 Tita Cervera (born 1943), Spanish socialite and former Miss Spain
 Tita Swarding (1952-2013), Filipino radio broadcaster
 Tita (footballer, born 1958), full name Milton Queiroz da Paixão, Brazilian football manager and former forward
 Tita von Hardenberg (born 1968), German noblewoman and television journalist
 Tita (footballer, born 1981), full name Sidney Cristiano dos Santos, Brazilian football forward
 Tita (Portuguese footballer), full name Ana Filipa Capitão Lopes, Portuguese women's football midfielder
 Tita Bell (fl. 1995-2007), American television soap opera writer
 Tita (singer) (born 1999), full name Hristina Milenova Pencheva, Bulgarian singer
 Tita Aida, American social activist
 Tita, fictional protagonist for Mexican novel Like Water for Chocolate

Surname
 Vasile Tiță (1928-2013), Romanian boxer
 Ruggero Tita (born 1992), Italian sailor
 Mohamed Hassan Tita (fl. 1995-2001), Egyptian Islamic Jihad
 Florin Tița (fl. 2019), Romanian Greco-Roman wrestler

Other uses
 Tita language, Benue–Congo language of Nigeria
 Tita Neire, mountain in Valais, Switzerland
 Tita Vendia vase, Roman wine container from 620-600 BC
 Tita in Thibet, English play written in 1879
 Tita Tovenaar, Dutch television series

See also
 Titas (disambiguation)
 List of places named after Josip Broz Tito